The District Nurse is a British television series, produced by BBC Wales and shown on BBC One between 1984 and 1987.

The series was a period drama created by Julia Smith and Tony Holland (who both went on to create EastEnders) and starred Nerys Hughes as Megan Roberts, the titular district nurse fighting to improve living conditions for the people living in a poverty stricken mining town, Pencwm, in South Wales during the late 1920s.  The school scenes were filmed at Pont-y-Gof school in Ebbw Vale, shortly before the old school was demolished. The children and teachers at the school were involved in the first two series.

The outdoor school and street scenes were filmed at Troedrhiwgwair, a small village on the outskirts of Tredegar.  Most of the houses used have since been demolished, however, the street remains.

In the third series, shown in 1987 and set in the early 1930s, Megan had moved on to the seaside town of Glanmor (filmed in the Ceredigion university town of Aberystwyth where she worked with a father/son pair of doctors: Emlyn Isaacs (Freddie Jones) and James Isaacs (Nicholas Jones).

International sales
The District Nurse was shown by TV2 in New Zealand.
It was also dubbed and aired in Iran between 1984 and 1987.

Major cast
 Megan Roberts – (Nerys Hughes)
 David Price – (John Ogwen) (Series 1 & 2 only)
 Nesta Mogg – (Deborah Manship) (Series 1 & 2 only)
 Gwen Harris – (Margaret John) (Series 1 & 2 only)
 Evalina Williams – (Beth Morris) (Series 1 & 2 only)
 Dr Emlyn Isaacs – (Freddie Jones) (Series 3 only)
 Dr James Isaacs – (Nicholas Jones) (Series 3 only)
 Ruth Jones – (Janet Aethwy) (Series 3 only)

DVD release
The first series of The District Nurse was available on DVD (Region 2, UK) by DD Home Entertainment.

References

External links
 The District Nurse BBC programme page.
 

BBC television dramas
British medical television series
Period television series
BBC Cymru Wales television shows
Welsh television shows
1984 British television series debuts
1987 British television series endings
1980s British drama television series
Television shows set in Wales
1980s Welsh television series
English-language television shows